Qeshm Institute of Higher Education is a university on the island of Qeshm in Hormozgan province in the Persian Gulf in Iran.

The university was established in 2001. It offers undergraduate and graduate degrees in business administration in association with Carleton University of Canada.

See also

Higher Education in Iran

External links
 Official website

Universities in Iran
Educational institutions established in 2001
Education in Hormozgan Province
Buildings and structures in Hormozgan Province
2001 establishments in Iran